Polisportiva Olympia Agnonese is an Italian association football club, based in Agnone, Molise. Olympia Agnonese currently plays in Serie D.

History 
The club was founded in 1967.

Colors and badge 
The team's colors are all-dark red.

References

External links
Official site

Association football clubs established in 1967
Football clubs in Molise
1967 establishments in Italy